Mariyah (معریاہ) ( Imaairiya, also  Al-airiyah) is a neighborhood in the sub-governorate of Bariq in the province of Asir, Saudi Arabia. As for the highlands of Bariq, the climate is moderate throughout the year and very cold in the winter. The average temperature in the city ranges between 30 ° C, and the lowest is 18 °. Bariq Governorate is considered the richest city in the Kingdom with rainfall, as its annual rates range between 600-700 mm per year, and it is at the forefront in the Kingdom of Saudi Arabia. It is characterized by the fact that it falls in all seasons of the year, although most of it falls in the spring and winter and the least in summer.
.

See also 

 List of cities and towns in Saudi Arabia
 Regions of Saudi Arabia

References 

Populated places in Bareq
Populated places in 'Asir Province
Populated coastal places in Saudi Arabia